Martín Acuña, O. Carm. (died 1593) was a Roman Catholic prelate who served as Bishop of Lipari (1585–1593).

Biography
Martín Acuña was ordained a priest in the Carmelite Order.
On 11 December 1585, he was appointed during the papacy of Pope Sixtus V as Bishop of Lipari.
He served as Bishop of Lipari until his death in 1593.

See also 
Catholic Church in Italy

References

External links and additional sources
 (for Chronology of Bishops) 
 (for Chronology of Bishops) 

16th-century Roman Catholic bishops in Sicily
Bishops appointed by Pope Sixtus V
1593 deaths
Carmelite bishops